Novy Kutum is a rural locality (a settlement) in Tryokhprotoksky Selsoviet, Privolzhsky District, Astrakhan Oblast, Russia. The population was 134 as of 2010. There are 11 streets.

Geography 
Novy Kutum is located 6 km west of Nachalovo (the district's administrative centre) by road. Tri Potoka is the nearest rural locality.

References 

Rural localities in Privolzhsky District, Astrakhan Oblast